Bucculatrix inchoata is a moth in the  family Bucculatricidae. It was described by Edward Meyrick in 1913. It is found in South Africa and Namibia.

References

External links
Natural History Museum Lepidoptera generic names catalog

Bucculatricidae
Moths described in 1913
Taxa named by Edward Meyrick
Moths of Africa